Cerretti is a village in Tuscany, central Italy, administratively a frazione of the comune of Santa Maria a Monte, province of Pisa. At the time of the 2001 census its population was 488.

Cerretti is about 30 km from Pisa and 3 km from Santa Maria a Monte.

References 

Frazioni of the Province of Pisa